Connecticut's 21st State Senate district elects one member of the Connecticut State Senate. It consists of the city of Shelton, and parts of Seymour, Monroe, and Monroe. It has been represented by Republican Kevin C. Kelly since 2011.

List of Senators

Recent elections

2020

2018

2016

2014

2012

References

21